In the 2003 municipal elections in Ontario, voters in Ontario, Canada, elected mayors, councillors, school board trustees and all other elected officials in all of Ontario's municipalities.

Results of election
According to the Association of Municipalities of Ontario, province-wide turnout for municipal elections in 2003 was 40.18% across 408 municipalities. This was down roughly 1%. 574 positions were acclaimed and 28 municipalities reported that their entire councils were acclaimed. In all, there were 5,103 candidates for 2,268 positions.

Here are results of mayoral races in selected cities in the civic elections held on November 10, 2003.

Ajax
Steve Parish 10,302
Kip Van Kempen 4,192

Aurora
Tim Jones  5,597
Homer Farsad  3,014

Barrie
Rob Hamilton  14,213
Patricia B. Copeland  7,901
Jim Perri  5,020
Jon Vink  395

Belleville
Mary-Anne Sills 5,945
Neil R. Ellis 5,707
Doug Parker 3,256
Trueman Tuck 57

Brampton
Susan Fennell 34,436
Bill Cowie 19,184

Brant
Ron Eddy	4,391	
Steve Comisky	3,590

Brantford
Mike Hancock 11,668
Chris Friel 11,653
Randy Tooke 721

Burlington
Rob MacIsaac (acclaimed)

Caledon
Marolyn Morrison 4,075
Richard Whitehead 3,855
Gary Wiles 3,635
Anthony Di Somma 1,455

Cambridge
Doug Craig 13,005
Fatima Pereira 4,142

Chatham–Kent
Diane Gagner 16,737
Austin Wright 6,033
Mary K. Lee 4,817
Richard Erickson 4,202
Larry Brundritt 1,989
William "Bill" Arends 1,472

Clarington
John Mutton  16,143
Richard Ward 1,824

Cornwall
Phil Poirier  7,271
Brian Sylvester  6,131
Andre Rivette  1,756

Georgina
Robert Grossi 6,631
Jeffrey Holec 4,441

Greater Sudbury

In a surprisingly active race (Toronto was the only city in the province with more mayoral candidates on the ballot), city councillor David Courtemanche emerged the victor over businessman Paul Marleau to succeed retiring mayor Jim Gordon.

Guelph
In 2003, Guelph was the only major city in the province where both of the leading candidates for mayor were women.

Kate Quarrie 16,158
Karen Farbridge 12,291
Billy Craven 1,156
Kurt Krausewitz 423
John Ustation 347

Halton Hills
Rick Bonnette 5,035
John Day  4,022
Kathy Gastle  2,206
Marilyn Serjeantson  1,423

Haldimand
Marie Trainer 7,303
Lorraine Bergstrand 6,192
Wilfred Marlowe 1,363

Hamilton
See 2003 Hamilton municipal election

Larry Di Ianni 70,539
David Christopherson 54,298
Dick Wildeman 4,462
Michael Peters 3,270
Tom Murray 2,881
Michael J. Baldasaro  2,569
Matt Jelly  510

Kawartha Lakes
Barbara Kelly 9,748
John R. Macklem 7,189
Patrick J. O’Reilly 6,882
Patrick Dunn 4,585
Joe McGuire 4,335

Kingston
Harvey Rosen  23,179
Isabel Turner  4,550
Richard Moller  3,167
Dave Meers  2,958
Jeffrey P. Lowes  453
Joseph R. Barr  263

Kitchener
Carl Zehr 23,707
Jon Huemiller 4,553
Ferenc Kulcsar 739

London
Anne Marie DeCicco  48,789
Vaughan Minor  37,337
Garry Moon 1,871
Ivan W. Kasiurak  865
Andrew McIlhargey  729
Carl Harris  636
Frank Burlock  578
Linden John Cassina  506
Mesbah Eldeeb  388
Kenneth Venus  312
Peter Schuller  296

Markham
Donald Cousens 31,532
Bernadette Manning 5,635
Sam Orrico 1,941

Milton
Gord Krantz 6,238
Rick Malboeuf 2,224
Al Volpe  701
Las Polcz 409
Vito Agozzino 369
David Lloyd 331

Mississauga
First elected mayor in 1978, Hazel McCallion was easily reelected to her tenth term. As one of the longest serving politicians in the country, Mayor McCallion is well known to Mississaugans.

Hazel McCallion 74,719
Masood Khan 2,304
Charles Coober 1,613
Larry J. Mancini 1,478
Dyal Chanderpaul 1,419

Newmarket
Al Heller  8,645
Tom Taylor  4,604
David Martin 2,268

Niagara Falls
Ted Salci 17,843
Wayne Thomson 10,284
Darren W. Wood 405
John (Ringo) Beam 376

Norfolk
See: 2003 Norfolk County municipal election

Rita Kalmbach  12,143
Brian Decker  5,158

North Bay
Vic Fedeli  13,025
Lynne Bennett  3,147
Tim Wright  686
Jeff Marceau  508

Oakville
Incumbent Ann Mulvale's narrow defeat of development skeptic Rob Burton had to be confirmed later in a judicial recount.

Ann Mulvale  15,728
Rob Burton  15,716
Richard Serra  573

Oshawa
Incumbent mayor Nancy Diamond was defeated by challenger John Gray in a race that also hinged on economic and urban development; Gray was the pro-development candidate.

John Gray  14,921
Michael Clarke  7,333
Nancy Diamond  5,871
Ed Kowalczyk  1,827
Darlene Hovland  229

Ottawa

Incumbent Bob Chiarelli was reelected after facing an unexpectedly strong challenge from Terry Kilrea.

Bob Chiarelli 104,595
Terry Kilrea 66,634
Ike Awgu 5,394
Ron Burke 2,698
John A. Bell 2,027
Donna Upson 1,312
Paula Nemchin 1,191
John Turmel 1,166

Peterborough
Sylvia Sutherland 11,194
Douglas Peacock 10,522
D. Paul Ayotte 5,155
Margaree Edwards 1,326

Pickering
Dave Ryan 10,426
Doug Dickerson 7,456

Quinte West
Bob Campney	 	4,611
Terry R. F. Cassidy	 	3,051
Bill Armstrong	 	2,801
Claude Rolland du-Lude	 	118

Richmond Hill
William F. Bell 14,405
William C. Lazenby 7,818
Sonny Khan 1,116

Sarnia
Mike Bradley 13,707
Rose-Ann Nathan 5,716
Tom Hurst     623
Carlos Murray     330
Hermann Martens    198

Sault Ste. Marie
John Rowswell 11,713
Peter Vaudry 8,579
Patricia Jennings 7,000
Gary Bedryk 812

St. Catharines
See: 2003 St. Catharines municipal election

Tim Rigby 9,558
Wendy Patriquin 9,504
Rondi Craig 9,189
Mark Klimchuk 1,166
Burt Koiter 415
Boris Petrovici 212

St. Thomas
Jeff Kohler 5,876
Joanne Brooks 3,596
John R. Heaslip 587

Thunder Bay
Lynn Peterson   26,572
Frank Pullia  13,690
Orville Santa  3,767
Don Slobojan  3,602
(Mike) Marvin McMenemy  330

Timmins
Victor M. Power, Mayor of Timmins for 17 of the 20 years from 1980 to 2000, who did not stand in the 2000 municipal election, came out of retirement and was returned against one-term incumbent and the first female mayor of Timmins Jamie Lim.

Victor M. Power 11,792
Jamie Lim 6,653

Toronto
David Miller was elected mayor defeating John Tory, Barbara Hall and John Nunziata.
See also: 2003 Toronto municipal election Results of 2003 Toronto election

Vaughan
Michael Di Biase 26,113
Robert Craig 15,351

Waterloo
Herb Epp 11,388
Lynne Woolstencroft  5,706
Morty Taylor 5,699
Ben Brown  337

Welland
Damian Goulbourne  7,554
Cindy Forster 5,312
Philip Bradley  2,036
Dick Reuter  1,892
John Watt  473
Frank Garofalo  378

Whitby
Marcel Brunelle 11,548
Judy Griffiths 3,052

Windsor
Eddie Francis 39,042
Bill Marra 31,517
Ernie Lamont 2,484

Woodstock
Michael Harding 4,789
Sandra J. Talbot 3,520

See also
Municipal elections in Canada
2000 Ontario municipal elections
2006 Ontario municipal elections